Franco Petracchi (born September, 1937) is an Italian double bass soloist and teacher. He is a native of Pistoia, Tuscany, and the author of Simplified Higher Technique. In his method, he introduces some conventions to playing in the thumb-position. He uses names chromatic, semi-chromatic and diatonic for different hand positions. He plays a Gaetano Rossi bass, which is unusually large for a soloist.

References
Rodney Slatford. "Francesco Petracchi", Grove Music Online, ed. L. Macy (accessed September 6, 2006), grovemusic.com  (subscription access).

External links

Franco Petracchi website

1937 births
Living people
Classical double-bassists
Italian musicians
21st-century double-bassists